Papyrus 66 (also referred to as 𝔓66) is a near complete codex of the Gospel of John, and part of the collection known as the Bodmer Papyri.

Description

The manuscript contains John 1:1–6:11, 6:35b–14:26, 29–30; 15:2–26; 16:2–4, 6–7; 16:10–20:20, 22–23; 20:25–21:9, 12, 17. It is one of the oldest well-preserved New Testament manuscripts known to exist. Its original editor assigned the codex to the early third century, or around AD 200, on the basis of its style of handwriting.  Herbert Hunger later claimed that the handwriting should be dated to an earlier period in the middle or early part of the second century. More recently, Brent Nongbri has produced a broader study of the codex and argued that when one takes into consideration the format, construction techniques, and provenance of the codex along with the handwriting, it is more reasonable to conclude that the codex was produced "in the early or middle part of the fourth century." In common with both the other surviving early papyri of John's Gospel – P45 (apparently), P75, and most New Testament uncials – Papyrus 66 does not include the pericope of the adulteress (7:53-8:11), demonstrating the absence of this passage in all the surviving early witnesses of the Gospel of John. The manuscript also contains, consistently, the use of Nomina Sacra.

Studies done by Karyn Berner and Philip Comfort contended that 𝔓66 had the work of three individuals on it: the original, professional scribe; a thoroughgoing corrector; and a minor corrector.  But more recently James Royse argues that, with the possible exception of John 13:19, the corrections are all by the hand of the original copyist.

The staurogram appears in at least ten places in the papyrus (corresponding to chapter 19 of the Gospel).

Text
The Greek text of this codex is a representative of the Alexandrian text-type. Aland ascribed it as "Free text" and placed it in I Category.

A transcription of every single page of 𝔓66 is contained in Text of the Earliest New Testament Greek manuscripts.

In John 1:15 ο οπισω ] ο πισω, the reading is supported by Sangallensis and 1646;

In John 13:5 it has unique textual variant ποδονιπτηρα instead of νιπτηρα.

In John 13:7 it has αρ (error) instead of αρτι (now).

History
The manuscript was found in 1952 at Jabal Abu Mana near Dishna (Egypt). The preservation level of 𝔓66 surprised scholars because the first 26 leaves were basically fully intact, and even the stitching of the binding remained.

It was published in 1956 and it was the most important New Testament manuscript publication since the Chester Beatty Papyri in 1933–1934.

It is currently housed at the Cologny-Geneva, Switzerland: Bibliotheca Bodmeriana. The Papyrus contains 39 folios – that is 78 leaves, 156 pages – at a size of 14.2 cm x 16.2 cm for each leaf with roughly 15-25 lines per page.

See also
 List of New Testament papyri
 Bodmer papyri

References

Further reading

 Karyn L. Berner, Papyrus Bodmer II, P66: A re-evaluation of the Correctors and corrections, M.A. thesis, Wheaton College, Ill. (1993).
 Victor Martin, Papyrus Bodmer II: Evangile de Jean 1-14, Bibliotheca Bodmeriana 5. Cologny-Geneva, Bibliothèque Bodmer, 1956.
 Victor Martin, Papyrus Bodmer II: Evangile de Jean 14-21, Cologny-Geneva, Bibliothèque Bodmer, 1958.
 Victor Martin, J. W. B. Barns, Papyrus Bodmer II. Supplement. Évangile de Jean chap. 14-21. New edition augmented and corrected with the photographic reproduction of the complete manuscript (chap. 1-21), Cologny-Geneva, Bibliothèque Bodmer, 1962.
 James R. Royse, Scribal Habits in Early Greek New Testament Papyri, Atlanta: Society of Biblical Literature, 2008.

External links

 Image of p 52 of Papyrus 66 at Bible Research
 
 Edgar R. Smothers, Papyrus Bodmer II: An Early Codex of St. John „Theological Studies”
 3D visualization of Papyrus Bodmer II, Fondation Martin Bodmer (in collaboration with Artmyn). 
 Transcription of P66, with side-by-side translation

New Testament papyri
2nd-century biblical manuscripts
Early Greek manuscripts of the New Testament
Gospel of John papyri